Ahmed Goneim (born 1937) is an Egyptian gymnast. He competed in eight events at the 1960 Summer Olympics.

References

1937 births
Living people
Egyptian male artistic gymnasts
Olympic gymnasts of Egypt
Gymnasts at the 1960 Summer Olympics
Sportspeople from Cairo